Charles Snelling may refer to:
Charles Snelling (figure skater), Canadian and Olympic figure skater
Charlie Snelling (1886–1957), Canadian amateur ice hockey player and paddler
Charles Mercer Snelling (1862 – 1939), Chancellor of the University of Georgia and the University System of Georgia